Muditā (Pāli and Sanskrit: मुदिता) means joy; especially sympathetic or vicarious joy, or the pleasure that comes from delighting in other people's well-being.

The traditional paradigmatic example of this mind-state is the attitude of a parent observing a growing child's accomplishments and successes. Mudita should not be confused with pride, as a person feeling mudita may not have any benefit or direct income from the accomplishments of the other. Mudita is a pure joy unadulterated by self-interest.

Application
Mudita meditation is used to cultivate appreciative joy at the success and good fortune of others.

The Awakened One, Lord Buddha, said:

Buddhist teachers interpret mudita more broadly as an inner spring of infinite joy that is available to everyone at all times, regardless of circumstances.

Joy is also traditionally regarded as the most difficult to cultivate of the four immeasurables (brahmavihārā: also "four sublime attitudes"). To show joy is to celebrate happiness and achievement in others even when we are facing tragedy ourselves.

According to Buddhist teacher Ayya Khema showing joy towards sadistic pleasure is wrong. Here there should instead be compassion (karuṇā).

The "far enemies" of joy are jealousy (envy) and greed, mind-states in obvious opposition. Joy's "near enemy," the quality which superficially resembles joy but is in fact more subtly in opposition to it, is exhilaration, described as a grasping at pleasant experience out of a sense of insufficiency or lack.

See also
 Brahmavihara
 Karuṇā (compassion)
 Metta (loving-kindness)
 Mind Stream
 Pīti (joy)
 Sukha (happiness)
 Upekkha (equanimity)
 Similar concepts in other cultures:
Naches - A Yiddish term with a very similar meaning
Firgun - A Hebrew term with a similar meaning

References

External links
Mudita: The Buddha's Teaching on Unselfish Joy: Four Essays by Nyanaponika Thera
Four Sublime States and The Practice of Loving Kindness by Ñāṇamoli Bhikkhu & Nyanaponika Thera
Just One More … by Ajahn Amaro
 Mudita - A brief passage on mudita from the Brahma-Vihara Foundation

Emotions
Wholesome factors in Buddhism
Sanskrit words and phrases